is a Japanese actor who is affiliated with Stardust Promotion.

Filmography

TV series

Films

References

External links
 Koutaro Tanaka's official website 
 Official profile at Stardust Promotion 

Japanese male actors
1982 births
Living people
People from Tokyo
Stardust Promotion artists